Else Hertzer (1884–1978) was a 20th-century German artist representing the German Expressionism Movement. Her later works became more abstract.

Life

She was born Else Heintze on 24 November 1884 at 22 Collegienstrasse in Wittenberg close to Martin Luther's house.

In 1909 (on marriage) she moved to Altonaer Strasse in the Tiergarten district of Berlin. Between 1911 and 1913 she spent much time with her in-laws in Buttstadt in Thuringia in central Germany. Here she began producing drypoint etchings and several paintings. From 1918 she joined the Berlin Secession Movement. Her first publicly exhibited painting was "Frohnau".

Around 1919 began formal studies at the Academy of Arts in Berlin, alongside George Mosson. In 1929 she went to Paris for further lessons under Andre Lhote.

During the Second World War she received a peculiar commission from her home town to create a series of wall murals for a communal bunker serving as an air-raid shelter. The murals depicted the history of Wittenberg. Wittenberg's location and lack of strategic importance meant that the town (and bunker) escaped without damage, but the bunker was later removed when under GDR control.

Following her 90th birthday the Berliner Morgenpost commented on her continuing freshness of style and enduring popularity.

She died at 7 Dortmunder Strasse in Berlin on 9 February 1978.

Family

In 1909 she married Otto Hertzer, gaining the name Else Hertzer.

Exhibitions
 Else Hertzer & Brun-Stiller, Parkhaus im Englischen Garten, Berlin, 1962
 Else Hertzer, Haus der Kirche, Berlin, 1969
 Else Hertzer zum 90. Geburtstag: Gemälde, Zeichnungen, Aquarelle, Radierungen, Parkhaus im Englischen Garten Berlin, 1966, 1970 und 17. Juni–15. Juli 1975
 Das nachgelassene Werk aus 70 Jahren, Haus am Lützowplatz Berlin, 1979
 Der Fläming bei Wittenberg, Dreißig Originalwerke aus den Jahren 1907 bis 1951, Historischer Saal des Simonettihauses, Coswig (Anhalt), 2016
 Luther und die Kühe. 20 Bilder der Avantgarde-Künstlerin Else Hertzer, Vlora-Café, Wittenberg, 2017
 „Else Hertzer“ – Bilder aus dem Fläming, agnes neuhaus café, Berlin-Niederschönhausen, 9. Juni 2017–15. Juli 2017
 Retrospektive "Else Hertzer. Die Vielseitige. Wittenberg. Berlin. Buttstädt. Paris", Kunsthaus Apolda, 30. Juni bis 1. September 2019 (Aufgerufen am 13. Juli. 2019)
 "Else Hertzer. Kriegsmappe 1945", Museum of Municipal Collections in the Zeughaus, Lutherstadt Wittenberg, 2019
 Wiederentdeckt: Else Hertzer (1884–1978) – Aquarelle und Zeichnungen aus Füssen, den Alpen, Wittenberg und Berlin, Museum der Stadt Füssen, 20. Juni 2020 bis 6. September 2020

Publications
Parthenon Vertag (1924) 250 hand-printed copies including six woodcuts

References

1884 births
1978 deaths
People from Wittenberg
German Expressionist painters
20th-century German painters